Yang Ting (born 4 June 1993) is a Chinese footballer who currently plays for Chengdu Rongcheng.

Club career
Yang Ting started his professional football career in 2012 when he was promoted to China League One side Chengdu Blades's first team squad. He made his senior debut on 27 June 2012 in the third round of 2012 Chinese FA Cup against Jiangsu Sainty. He made his league debut on 1 July 2012 in a league match against Chongqing FC and scored his first senior goal in the match, which ensured Chengdu's 2–1 win. Yang became a regular starter of the club after his debut, playing 56 league matches for Chengdu between 2012 and 2014 season.

Yang transferred to Belgian Second Division side Tubize in February 2015 after Chengdu's dissolution. On 15 August 2015, he made his debut for Tubize in the fourth round of 2015–16 Belgian Cup against Charleroi-Marchienne. His league debut came on 17 October 2015, in a 6–1 away win against Heist, coming on for Andrei Camargo in the 81st minute.

Yang joined Chinese Super League side Guangzhou R&F in December 2015. On 10 May 2016, he made his debut for Guangzhou in the third round of 2016 Chinese FA Cup against Hainan Boying & Seamen. In August 2016, he was loaned to Hong Kong Premier League side R&F, which was the satellite team of Guangzhou R&F. He made his debut on 18 September 2016 in the 2016–17 Hong Kong Senior Challenge Shield against BC Glory Sky. He scored his first goal for the club on 30 September 2016, in a 2–1 away win against Hong Kong Pegasus. He scored another goal on 17 February 2017, in a 4–3 away win against Hong Kong FC.

On 24 February 2017, Yang was loaned to Super League newcomer Guizhou Hengfeng for one season. He made his debut for Guizhou on 22 April 2017 in a 2–0 home defeat against Shanghai Shenhua. On 3 May 2017, he scored his first goal for the club in a 5–3 away defeat against Shanghai Shenxin in the 2017 Chinese FA Cup. At the end of the 2017 season, Yang went on to make 16 appearances for the club in all competitions. He made a permanent transfer to Guizhou Hengfeng on 9 February 2018, signing a three-year contract. With his contract ending he was free to join Chengdu Rongcheng on 3 August 2021. He would have to wait until the following season to make his debut, which was in the 2022 Chinese FA Cup against Hebei on 16 November 2022 in a 3-0 victory.

Career statistics
.

References

External links
 

1993 births
Living people
Chinese footballers
Footballers from Sichuan
People from Leshan
Chengdu Tiancheng F.C. players
A.F.C. Tubize players
Guangzhou City F.C. players
R&F (Hong Kong) players
Guizhou F.C. players
Association football defenders
Chinese Super League players
China League One players
Challenger Pro League players
Hong Kong Premier League players
Chinese expatriate footballers
Expatriate footballers in Belgium
Chinese expatriate sportspeople in Belgium
Footballers at the 2014 Asian Games
Asian Games competitors for China